Mochlus lanceolatus, also known as Broadley's writhing skink, is a species of skink. It is endemic to Mozambique and found in the Bazaruto Archipelago and the adjacent mainland (northern tip of the San Sebastian Peninsula). It inhabits dune thicket habitats at elevations below . The known range falls entirely within protected areas (Bazaruto Archipelago National Park and Vilanculos Coastal Wildlife Sanctuary).

References

Mochlus
Skinks of Africa
Reptiles of Mozambique
Endemic fauna of Mozambique
Reptiles described in 1990
Taxa named by Donald George Broadley